The 2019 NCAA Women's Gymnastics Championships were held April 19–20, 2019, at the Fort Worth Convention Center in Fort Worth, Texas. The national championship has changed to a new format. The number of regions is reduced from six to four. Regional competitions took place on April 4–6. The top two teams from each region advanced to the championship competition at the Fort Worth Convention Center.

Regional Championships
The top two teams from each region will move to the championship round, indicated in bold.

 Baton Rouge, La. (Pete Maravich Assembly Center, April 4–6)
Regional final teams: LSU* 197.500, Utah 197.250, Minnesota 196.900,  Auburn 195.725

 Ann Arbor, Mich. (Crisler Center, April 4–6)
Regional final: UCLA* 198.075, Michigan 197.275, Alabama 197.225, Nebraska 196.650
Notes: Kyla Ross, UCLA, scored	10.000 on both the uneven bars and balance beam

 Athens, Ga. (Stegeman Coliseum, April 4–6)
Regional final teams: Oklahoma* 198.475, Georgia 198.050,  California 197.675, Kentucky 197.600 
 Notes: Marissa Oakley, University of Georgia and Maggie Nichols, Oklahoma, scored 10.000 on uneven bars
 
 Corvallis, Ore. (Gill Coliseum, April 4–6)
Regional final teams: Denver* 197.375, Oregon St. 196.900, Florida 196.700, Boise St. 196.075 
* – Denotes regional champions

NCAA Championship
Semifinal I (April 19, 12:00PM CDT)

Semifinal II (April 19, 7:00PM CDT)

Bold – Denotes Final Four teams (Session's top two teams)

Standings
National Champion: Oklahoma - 198.3375
2nd Place: LSU - 197.8250
3rd Place: UCLA - 197.5375
4th Place: Denver - 197.0000

Individual results
Source:

Medalists

All-Around

Event champions
Vault: Kyla Ross (UCLA), Kennedi Edney (LSU), Derrian Gobourne (Auburn), Maggie Nichols (Oklahoma) - 9.95

Uneven bars: Sarah Finnegan (LSU) - 9.95

Balance beam: Natalie Wojcik (Michigan) - 9.95

Floor exercise: Kyla Ross (UCLA), Alicia Boren (Florida), Lynnzee Brown (Denver), Brenna Dowell (Oklahoma) - 9.95

References

NCAA Women's Gymnastics championship
2019 in American sports
NCAA Women's Gymnastics Championship
2019 NCAA Division I women's gymnastics season
Sports competitions in Fort Worth, Texas